Gia Alessandra Crovatin is an American actress and producer. She is best known for her film roles as Dylan in the 2015 comedy film Dirty Weekend and Sasha in the comedy film I Feel Pretty.

Her television roles include Drew in the comedy series Billy & Billie (2015–2016), Anastasia in the thriller series Van Helsing (2016–2017), McKayla in Billions (2017–2018) and Devonne Wilson in Hightown (2020–present).

She frequently collaborates in stage plays directed by Neil LaBute.

Career
In 2008, Crovatin made her screen debut when she played a character in the short film The Conservatory. The following year, she played Malerie in the short film Coffee's Better Without Dinner.

Following this, she went on to play Dylan Price in the 2015 comedy film Dirty Weekend, featuring Matthew Broderick and Alice Eve. From 2015 to 2016, she then played the role of Drew in the comedy television series Billy & Billie, for 9 episodes.

From 2016 to 2017, she played Anastasia in the thriller series Van Helsing for 4 episodes. From 2017 to 2018, she played McKayla in the drama television series Billions for 5 episodes. In 2018, Crovatin played Sasha in the comedy film I Feel Pretty, featuring Amy Schumer.

In 2020, she played the girlfriend of Monica Raymund's character in the drama series Hightown. The same year, she played a wife in True Love Will Find You in the End, a stage play that is set in the COVID-19 pandemic.

Personal life

2017 Women's March in New York City

In New York City, Crovatin took part in the 2017 Women's March, which lasted for two days, following the inauguration of Donald Trump.

Filmography

Film

Television

References

External links
 

American film actresses
American television actresses
21st-century American actresses
People from Los Angeles
American people of Italian descent
American people of Dutch descent
American people of Swedish descent
American people of Irish descent
American people of Norwegian descent
American people of English descent
American people of German descent
American people of Slovenian descent
Actresses from Los Angeles
Actresses from California
Living people
Year of birth missing (living people)